The 2008 Australian Mini Challenge was the inaugural running of the Australian Mini Challenge. It began on 7 March at Eastern Creek Raceway and ended on 7 December at Oran Park Raceway.

Teams and drivers
The following teams and drivers contested the 2008 Australian Mini Challenge.

Calendar
The 2008 Australian Mini Challenge will be contested over eight rounds, starting at Eastern Creek in March and finishing at Oran Park in December.

V8SCS - V8 Supercar Championship Series
FV8SCS - Fujitsu V8 Supercars Series

Driver standings
After round 8:

The other results were
16th: Michael Stillwell – 132 
17th: Iain Sherrin – 117 
18th: Robert Graham – 111 
19th: David Stillwell – 108 
20th: Brent Collins – 96 
21st: Jason White – 96 
22nd: Paul Morris – 84 
23rd: Barry Sternbeck – 78 
24th: Matt Neal – 78 
25th: Beric Lynton – 75 
26th: Mike Sherrin – 69 
27th: Damien Flack – 60 
28th: Tim Leahey – 54 
29th: Christopher Oxley – 54 
30th: Ricky Occhipinti – 54 
31st: Brendon Cook – 51 
32nd: Jim Sweeney – 42 
33rd: Callum Ballinger – 39 
34th: Tim Poulton – 30 
35th: Edward Singleton – 27 
36th: Kevin Miller – 18 
37th: Jason Akermanis – 18 
38th: Ryan Mcleod – 15 
39th: Chris Wootton – 9

References

Mini Challenge